Back To Earth is the first studio album by Swedish project Caligola.

Track listing
Listed tracks are:

References

2012 debut albums